Brooke C. Wells is a federal magistrate judge for the United States District Court for the District of Utah. She was appointed to this position on June 4, 2003.

Early life and education 
Wells was raised in Oklahoma, and attended Oklahoma State for two years, but moved to Utah before completing her degree there. 
	
Wells had wanted to attend law school, but did not think that pathway open to her  but changed her mind after she served as secretary to Randy Dryer while he was the Student Body President at the University of Utah.
 
Wells graduated from the University of Utah with an undergraduate degree in Political Science in 1973. She enrolled in the University of Utah's master's degree program in Public Administration and started taking classes, but no longer pursued the degree after she decided to attend law school instead.  She received her juris doctor degree from the University of Utah's S. J. Quinney School of Law in 1977.

Legal career 
Although she took and passed the Utah bar exam following graduation from law school, Wells moved to San Antonio, Texas. After she passed the Texas Bar Exam, she was hired as a legal services lawyer for Bexar County Legal Aid and provided civil legal assistance to indigent clients for two and a half years.  However, she was eventually drawn to Utah again. She says she fully believes in the “theory that often times you have to leave someplace to find out how much you liked it and how much you want to return.”

Beginning in 1979, and for almost fifteen years thereafter, Wells represented criminal defendants as an attorney in Salt Lake City for the Utah Legal Defender's Office.  In 1994, U.S. Attorney Scott Matheson appointed her to Assistant U.S. Attorney, and she began her career as a legal prosecutor.  Wells held the position of Chief of the Violent Crimes Section for eight and a half years until she was appointed as a federal magistrate judge in Utah in 2003.

High-profile clients as a legal defender 
Wells litigated over 100 jury trials and more than 20 capital homicides during her time as a legal defender.  Two of her more high-profile clients were the following:

Ralph Menzies 
In 1987, Ralph Leroy Menzies was convicted of the kidnap and murder of Maurine Hunsaker, a mother of four abducted from her work at a Kearns gas station. Menzies was sentenced to the death penalty and is still on death row while numerous appeals are heard.

Steven Ray Stout 
Stout pleaded guilty on September 27, 1989 to capital murder and second-degree murder. The victims were Bonnie Craft, his estranged wife's step mother (age 41) and her daughter Maureen Turner (age 18).  Prosecutors argued that because Stout brutally killed the two West Valley citizens he should be given the death penalty. In response, Brooke Wells and Elizabeth Bowman, the two legal defenders assigned to the case had a psychologist testify that Stout suffers from post-traumatic stress syndrome—a rare occurrence at the time.  This was one of the first cases in which this defense was used, and it was deemed the “shell shock” defense.  Stout, who was on the FBI's Ten Most Wanted list, avoided the death penalty and was sentenced to life in prison.

Selected cases as an Assistant U.S. Attorney

United States v. Eric W. Wicklund, 114 F. 3d 151 (10th Cir. 1997) 
A Salt Lake City jury found Wicklund guilty of scheming to shoot his wife's ex-husband, Robert Laumann, an Idaho trooper from Downey so that his wife, Paige, would no longer have to pay child support to Laumann, who won custody in their divorce.  Ms. Wells was the prosecutor who obtained the conviction.  The Tenth Circuit Court of Appeals subsequently reversed the decision, holding that the trial judge misinterpreted and misapplied the statute under which Wicklund was charged.  Wicklund was sentenced to ten years in prison.

The client, Gerry Curtis Branagan, had failed to attend his trial in Utah County and was thus convicted in absentia.  It was alleged that his attorney hid and threw out stolen goods from Branagan's residence in California.  The jury found his guilty of “concealing a fugitive from arrest and concealing and disposing of stolen goods.” Branagan was sentenced to 63 months in federal prison and a $10,000 fine.
F. and E. were later acquitted of their convictions

Judicial career 
From 2008 until the present, Wells has presided over two specialized federal court programs.  The first program, called RISE (Reentry Independence through Sustainable Efforts), was the only program in the United States, when it started, to have a specialized mental health court docket for people coming out of federal prison with severe mental illness. The mental health defendants have an obligation to attend counseling, take prescribed medications, and report to the court on a weekly basis as a part of their plea in abeyance that keeps them out of prison. Wells said, “It’s a positive approach rather than a punitive approach…we’re a problem-solving group.”

The second program is a specialized drug court docket for re-entry for people with severe drug abuse problems. She also chairs a state federal advisory board to attempt to identify and eliminate barriers to employment, where re-entering offenders can meet their obligations instead of returning to prison.

Selected civil cases

SCO v. IBM 
On March 3, 2003, SCO Group filed a multibillion-dollar lawsuit against IBM for allegedly devaluing its version of the Linux operating system and breaching its obligations under various UNIX licensing agreements. Federal Magistrate Judge Brooke Wells was in charge of presiding over all discovery aspects of the case. She made several key rulings in the case regarding the scope of discovery, sanctions, and the scope of permissible claims allowed to be tried. The presiding trial judge upheld her rulings. The litigation has had many turns and twists, including detours to appeals and bankruptcy courts. The matter is still in litigation.

Professional recognition 
Wells became the first Utah woman inducted into the American Board of Criminal Lawyers in 1992.  Also in 1992, Governor Mike Leavitt’s Commission for Women and Families named her one of their ten “Remarkable Utah Women.”  In 1993, she became the first Utah woman to become a member of the American College of Trial Lawyers. Also, after nine years as federal prosecutor, she was officially recognized by the Department of Justice for Outstanding Achievement as an Assistant United States Attorney. Judge Wells gave the commencement address to the 2006 graduating class at the S.J. Quinney College of Law, her alma mater.

Personal life 
Outside of her time on the bench, Judge Wells enjoys riding horses.  She owns several horses that she houses in Salt Lake County for the warmer times of the year and Sanpete County for the more drastic temperatures and weather of winter months.  During her spare time, she can be found riding trails, taking care of barn duties, or playing with her Springer Spaniels.

References 

Living people
American women judges
S.J. Quinney College of Law alumni
University of Utah alumni
United States magistrate judges
Year of birth missing (living people)
21st-century American women